César Ezequiel Horst (born May 4, 1989 in Gualeguaychú (Entre Ríos), Argentina) is an Argentine footballer currently playing for Deportes Copiapó of the Segunda División Chilena.

Teams
  Boca Juniors 2008-2011
  Platense 2011
  Deportes Copiapó 2012–present

References
 Profile at BDFA 

1989 births
Living people
Argentine footballers
Argentine expatriate footballers
Boca Juniors footballers
Club Atlético Platense footballers
Deportes Copiapó footballers
Argentine Primera División players
Segunda División Profesional de Chile players
Expatriate footballers in Chile
Argentine people of Volga German descent

Association footballers not categorized by position
Sportspeople from Entre Ríos Province